Dolac may refer to several places:

In Bosnia and Herzegovina
Dolac, Busovača, village in the municipality of Busovača
Dolac, Glamoč, village in the municipality of Glamoč
Dolac, Travnik, village in the municipality of Travnik
Dolac, Zavidovići, village in the municipality of Zavidovići

In Montenegro
Dolac, Berane, town in the municipality of Berane
Dolac, Bijelo Polje, village in the municipality of Bijelo Polje

In Serbia
Dolac, Bela Palanka, village in the municipality of Bela Palanka
 Dolac (village)
Dolac, Kraljevo, village in the municipality of Kraljevo
Dolac (Novi Pazar), village in the municipality of Novi Pazar

In Croatia
 Dolac Market, a farmers' market in Zagreb, Croatia
 Dolac, Požega-Slavonia County, a village in Slavonia
 Primorski Dolac, a village in inland Dalmatia near Šibenik
 Gornji Dolac, a village in inland Dalmatia near Omiš
 Donji Dolac, a village in inland Dalmatia near Omiš